This is a list of railway companies in Norway.

Companies

Type indicates the role of the company. Integrated companies operate both the infrastructure and the trains. Freight companies operate only freight trains, while ore companies operate ore trains on contract with a mining company on a single line. Passenger companies operate only passenger trains, trams or rapid transits. Infrastructure companies are government-owned agencies or limited companies that own only the right-of-way, while the trains are operated by other companies. Authorities are public bodies responsible for marketing, grants and planning of the urban railways. Rolling stock companies only own the rolling stock, which is leased to other companies.

 
Norway